David King Willocks (6 January 1871 – 1950) was a Scottish footballer who played in the Football League for Bolton Wanderers and Burton Swifts, and in the Scottish Football League for Dundee.

References

1871 births
1950 deaths
Date of death missing
Scottish footballers
English Football League players
Scottish Football League players
Association football inside forwards
Arbroath F.C. players
Bolton Wanderers F.C. players
Burton Swifts F.C. players
Dundee F.C. players
Brighton United F.C. players
Footballers from Angus, Scotland
People from Arbroath